Phaea crocata is a species of beetle in the family Cerambycidae. It was described by Francis Polkinghorne Pascoe in 1866. It is known from Panama and Colombia.

References

crocata
Beetles described in 1866